The Genesis of Shannara is a series of novels written by Terry Brooks.  The first book, Armageddon's Children, was released by Del Rey Books on August 29, 2006, in the United States and by Orbit Books on September 7, 2006, in the United Kingdom.
These novels bridge the Word & Void series with the Legends of Shannara series, two other of Brooks' productions. They cover events during The Great Wars, which are alluded to often in the Shannara series.

The books

Armageddon's Children (2006)
The first novel in the Genesis trilogy details the quest of two Knights of the Word in protecting two powerful magics in a post-apocalyptic Earth.

The Elves of Cintra (2007)
This book deals mostly with the Elves first mentioned in Armageddon's Children. It continues the storyline of the two Knights of the Word of the previous book. It was released August 28, 2007.

The Gypsy Morph (2008)
The conclusion to the trilogy deals with the titular Gypsy Morph finding the safe haven from the coming cataclysm to protect those that will populate the new world.  It was released on August 26, 2008.

References

External links
Terry Brooks official site

Book series introduced in 2006
Genesis